Steleopteon  is a genus of extinct winged damselflies whose fossils have been found in  modern Germany, and Great Britain, and which lived at the end of the Jurassic and the beginning of the Cretaceous (150.8 to 130 million years ago).

The genus was described by the Austrian paleoentomologist Anton Handlirsch in 1906 on the basis of the fossilised exoskeleton Steleopteron deichmuelleri. Until 2018, it had been believed that the genus became extinct in the Jurassic, but the discovery of Steleopteron cretacicus showed that the genus and the family may have become extinct as late as the Cretaceous. In 2001, Fleck and others transferred the family, Steleopteridae to a suborder of winged damselflies, Zygoptera.

They were fast flying insectivorous/carnivorous predators.

According to the Fossilworks Database website, as of November 2019, the genus includes two extinct species:

Steleopteron cretacicus Zheng et al. 2018
Steleopteron deichmuelleri Handlirsch, 1906

References

Prehistoric insect genera
Zygoptera genera
Damselflies of Europe